Krasnikov (Russian: Красников) is a Russian masculine surname; its feminine counterpart is Krasnikova. It may refer to
Natella Krasnikova (born 1953), Russian field hockey player
Nikolay Krasnikov, Russian ice speedway rider
Nikolay Petrovich Krasnikov (born 1921), Russian philosopher, historian and religious scholar
Sergey Krasnikov (born 1961), Russian physicist
Krasnikov tube, a speculative mechanism for space travel 
Yana Krasnikova (born 1999), Ukrainian model and beauty pageant titleholder

Russian-language surnames